Sophie Lewis Drinker ( Hutchinson; August 24, 1888 – September 6, 1967) was an American author, musician, and musicologist. She is considered a founder of women's musicological and gender studies.

Early life and marriage
Drinker was born Sophie Lewis Hutchinson on 24 August 1888 in Haverford, Philadelphia, to Sydney Pemberton Hutchinson and Amy Lewis. She enjoyed a genteel childhood with nannies and domestic staff. The Hutchinson family, which dated back to the seventeenth century, had a high social status. As a child, Drinker had piano lessons and developed a general interest in music. She attended St. Timothy's School, an exclusive private school in Maryland. Upon graduation in 1906, Drinker was accepted to Bryn Mawr College, but she decided against attending.

In 1911, Drinker married Henry Sandwith Drinker, a lawyer and musicologist, and moved with him to Merion, Pennsylvania. Henry Drinker was a successful lawyer, but spent every minute of his spare time playing music, a passionate hobby that was as important to him as his real profession. Apart from active music-making, he devoted himself to the translation of the German text of vocal compositions of great composers into English. Among them are Schubert's songs and Haydn's Creation, and a variety of works by Johann Sebastian Bach, among others, the Christmas Oratorio, the St. John Passion and the St. Matthew Passion.

The couple had five children together: Sophie, Henry S., Jr., Cecelia, Ernesta, and Pemberton, all of whom had daily music lessons, and the whole family sat down together regularly to sing. They often visited musical events such as concerts, opera performances and music festivals, and were for 25 years subscribers to the Philadelphia Orchestra.

In 1928, the Drinkers built a new house, which contained a large music room where they regularly organized singing evenings, and sometimes they used the premises of the American Musicological Society for their gatherings. Most well-known were their exclusive singing parties that were invitation only, and involved a dinner prepared by the Drinker household staff with group song and music before and after. Oftentimes these evenings involved the accompaniment of musicians invited from prestigious institutions, such as the Philadelphia Orchestra and Curtis Institute.

Work
Sophie Drinker spent a significant portion of her life researching and writing about the history of women and music, as well as promoting choral singing by women. In 1930 she joined the Montgomery Singers, a women's chorus, and many years later she served as the group's president. In her scholarly work, Drinker was greatly influenced by Mary Ritter Beard, pioneer women's historian, and the democratic, economically oriented history of the "progressive" school to which Beard subscribed. She worked with Beard on her abortive project to establish the World Center for Women's Archives.

Sophie Drinker's attention lighted on the fact that there was very little quality music for female choirs, and saw that there were few women composers. This prompted her to conduct extensive research about women and their place in music history. Her results were presented in the book Music and Women: The Story of Women in Their Relation to Music which appeared in 1948. The book was widely reviewed by the historical community but did not receive much attention from the musical community until the late twentieth century. The book, argues Ruth A. Solie, has had a major impact on the study of women and music, and has been particularly influential to women in music. In 1995, The Feminist Press re-issued Women and Music, with a preface by Elizabeth Wood and an afterword by Solie.

During her life she published other writings, including the book Brahms and His Women's Choruses (1952) and articles like "What Price Women's Chorus?" for Music Journal in 1954. Here she developed criteria for compositions for women's choirs which in her view would utilize the full range of the female voice.

Cited for her "service in the cause of Music whereby she had brought together and made available much that, but for her, would have lain forgotten," Drinker was awarded an honorary doctorate from Smith College, Northampton, Massachusetts in 1949. She served for a time as a guest lecturer at Women's Medical College of Pennsylvania, from which she received an honorary degree in 1967.

Throughout her life Drinker was involved in a number of philanthropic, civic, and women's groups. In the 1950s, she served as an advisor to a chapter of Delta Omicron, though Drinker resigned after several years. She was also involved with the Marriage Council of Philadelphia, the Pennsylvania Society of the National Society of Colonial Dames of America, the Lucy Stone League, the Community Chest, and the League of Women Voters. Because of her work with, and writings on, women, Betty Friedan wanted Drinker to join the first elected board of the National Organization of Women. However, Drinker's health was failing at this point, so her daughter Ernesta volunteered in her place and won election to the board.

In 1965 Sophie Drinker wrote her memoirs, but they were meant for her family and have remained unpublished.

Death

Drinker died on 6 September 1967, of cancer.  She is interred in the family plot at West Laurel Hill Cemetery in Bala Cynwyd, Pennsylvania.

Legacy
The Sophie Drinker Institute was founded in Bremen, Germany in 2002. It is a free research institute that specializes in women's musicological studies and gender research.

Works

Music and Women: The Story of Women in Their Relation to Music. New York: Coward-McCann, Inc., 1948; reprint, New York: Feminist Press, 1995.
Brahms and His Women's Choruses. Merion, 1952.
"What Price Women's Choruses." Musical Journal 12/1, (1954), p. 19 & 42f.
The Woman in the Music: A Sociological Study. Zurich: Atlantis, 1955 (German translation: Karl and Irene Geiringer).
Hannah Penn and the proprietorship of Pennsylvania, Philadelphia: Priv. print. under the auspices of the National Society of the Colonial Dames of America in the Commonwealth of Pennsylvania, 1958
Eugenie with Andrus Leonard, Miriam Young Holden: The American Woman in Colonial and Revolutionary Times, 1565-1800: A Syllabus with Bibliography. Philadelphia: University of Pennsylvania Press, 1962

References

External links 
 Sophie Hutchinson Drinker papers at the Sophia Smith Collection, Smith College Special Collections
 Sophie Drinker Institut website

1888 births
1967 deaths
American women musicologists
20th-century American musicologists
20th-century American women musicians
20th-century American musicians
People from Philadelphia
20th-century American non-fiction writers
20th-century American women writers
Drinker family